The Catalina Flyer is a 500-passenger catamaran ferry operated by Catalina Passenger Service.

It has provided daily passenger service since 1988 from the Balboa Pavilion in Newport Beach, California to the city of Avalon located on Santa Catalina Island. Prior to 1988, the same run was served by the Island Holiday from the mid-1950s until 1978, and the Catalina Holiday from 1978 until 1988, both also operated by Catalina Passenger Service.

The Catalina Flyer is the largest passenger-carrying catamaran on the West Coast of the United States and at the time it was launched it was the largest in North America. It carries an eight-person crew, and features a sundeck, full-service lounges and large view windows.

The Catalina Flyer makes one round trip daily, leaving Newport Beach for Avalon in the morning and returning from Avalon to Newport Beach in the early evening. It takes approximately 75 minutes for a one way trip.  In addition to regular passenger service, the vessel is also available for private charter.

In the fall and winter of 2010–2011, the Flyer's service was temporarily suspended, in order to upgrade the ship's engines to meet the environmental requirements of California's Commercial Harbor Craft Regulation.

See also
Catalina Express, a different ferry service to Catalina from San Pedro, Long Beach, and Dana Point

References

External links
Catalina Flyer's Website

Individual catamarans
Ferries of California
Newport Beach, California
Channel Islands of California
Transportation in Orange County, California
Transportation in Los Angeles County, California
1988 ships